The Mandarin Mystery is a 1936 American film directed by Ralph Staub, loosely based on The Chinese Orange Mystery, a novel featuring detective character Ellery Queen.

Plot summary 
Two murders are committed and a $50,000 Chinese Mandarin stamp is stolen, tossed around and eventually recovered as an aggregation of costly-stamp counterfeiters are uncovered through the mastermind investigation by Ellery Queen.

Cast 
Eddie Quillan as Ellery Queen, a mystery writer and amateur detective
Charlotte Henry as Josephine Temple
Rita La Roy as Martha Kirk
Wade Boteler as Inspector Richard Queen, A police inspector, Ellery's father.
Franklin Pangborn as Mellish, the hotel manager
George Irving as Dr. Alexander Kirk
Kay Hughes as Irene Kirk
William Newell as Detective Guffy
George Walcott as Donald Trent
Edwin Stanley as Howard Bronson
Edgar Allen as Detective
Bert Roach
Richard Beach as Reporter
Monte Vandergrift as Detective
Grace Durkin as Girl on Street Corner
Mary Russell as Girl on Street Corner
Mary Bovard as Girl At Cocktail Bar
June Johnson as Girl At Cocktail Bar

Soundtrack 
No soundtrack album was created

External links 

1936 films
1930s comedy mystery films
American black-and-white films
Republic Pictures films
1936 comedy films
American comedy mystery films
Articles containing video clips
Films based on American novels
Films directed by Ralph Staub
Films produced by Nat Levine
1930s English-language films
1930s American films
Ellery Queen films